Roger Kabler is an American actor.

Career
In early 1990s ads, Kabler was known as the fedora-wearing "Zima guy". Aside from the fedora, his gimmick involved replacing "S" sounds with "Z" sounds, reinforcing the slogan "Zomething different."

On television, Kabler appeared as a member of the repertory company on CBS' The Carol Burnett Show in 1991. The next season, he landed the lead role of Bobby Soul in the short-lived NBC sitcom Rhythm & Blues.

As a celebrity impersonator, Kabler is known for his impression of Robin Williams and Jon Lovitz.

Filmography

Remote Control - MTV series
Rhythm & Blues as Bobby Soul
The Next Best Thing (TV series)
The Brave Little Toaster Goes to Mars- Radio
The Brave Little Toaster to the Rescue- Radio

References

External links
 

Living people
American male film actors
American male voice actors
1970 births